The 1988–89 Boston Bruins season saw the team finish in second place in the Adams Division with a record of 37 wins, 29 losses, and 14 ties for 88 points. They defeated the Buffalo Sabres in five games in the Division Semi-finals before falling to the Montreal Canadiens in the Division Finals, also in five games.

Regular season

On November 24, 1988, Bob Sweeney scored just 8 seconds into the overtime period to give the Bruins a 2-1 home win over the Philadelphia Flyers. It would prove to be the fastest overtime goal scored during the 1988-89 NHL regular season.

The Bruins allowed the fewest short-handed goals in the league, with just 4.

Final standings

Schedule and results

Playoffs

Adams Division Semifinals

Boston Bruins 4, Buffalo Sabres 1

Adams Division Finals

Montreal Canadiens 4, Boston Bruins 1

Player statistics

Forwards
Note: GP = Games played; G = Goals; A = Assists; Pts = Points; PIM = Penalty minutes

Defensemen
Note: GP = Games played; G = Goals; A = Assists; Pts = Points; PIM = Penalty minutes

Goaltending
Note: GP = Games played; W = Wins; L = Losses; T = Ties; SO = Shutouts; GAA = Goals against average

Awards and records
 Ray Bourque, Defence, NHL Second All-Star Team

Transactions

Draft picks
Boston's draft picks at the 1988 NHL Entry Draft held at the Montreal Forum in Montreal, Quebec.

Farm teams

References

Boston Bruins seasons
Boston Bruins
Boston Bruins
Boston Bruins
Boston Bruins
Bruins
Bruins